"Flood" is a song written and performed by Jars of Clay. It is considered to be their breakthrough song due to airplay on contemporary Christian music and alternative rock radio stations, two radio formats which rarely intersect. It was released in 1995 on their self-titled debut album. The album remained in the top 60 albums for much of the year and remained in Billboard 200 for an entire 52-week (one-year) cycle. The album went gold and, shortly after, attained platinum status. The debut album has now sold well over 2,000,000 copies.

The single was a multi-format crossover hit in the United States, peaking at No. 12 on the Billboard Modern Rock Tracks chart and No. 37 on the Billboard Hot 100.

Track listing
All songs written by Charlie Lowell, Dan Haseltine, Matt Odmark, & Stephen Mason.

U.S. commercial single
"Flood" - 3:31
"Sinking" - 3:47

U.S. 2-track radio promo (Silvertone Records)
"Flood" (Radio Edit) - 3:12
"Flood" (LP Version) - 3:31

U.S. 3-track radio promo (Silvertone Records)
"Flood" (Adrian Belew Electric Remix) - 3:30
"Flood" (Radio Edit) - 3:13
"Flood" (LP Version) - 3:31

U.S. radio promo (Essential Records)
"Flood" (Radio Edit) - 3:15
"Flood" (Short Edit) - 2:58

UK commercial maxi-single
"Flood" (Savage Flavor Remix) - 4:24
"Flood" - 3:33
"Sinking" - 3:48
"Blind" (The Fluffy-Sav Smoothed Out Mix) 5:08

Charts

Weekly charts

Year-end charts

In popular culture
The song plays over the closing credits of the 1998 film Hard Rain and is used in the 2002 film A Walk to Remember. It was the theme song of the A&E reality show, God or the Girl.

See also
Genesis flood narrative

References

External links
MTV Version music video on YouTube
Original Version music video on YouTube

1995 songs
1995 debut singles
Jars of Clay songs
Songs written by Dan Haseltine
Songs written by Charlie Lowell
Songs written by Stephen Mason (musician)
Songs written by Matt Odmark
Essential Records (Christian) singles
American alternative rock songs